Jonas Sven Hallberg, (born 7 December 1944) is a Swedish journalist and radio/television personality and presenter. He has participated in Spanarna in Sveriges Radio and presented Måndagsbörsen and Dominans on SVT. He has also worked as a stand-up comedian. In his youth he was friends with Jan Guillou, and Hallberg has described their friendship as Guillou being his first best friend.

In early 2010, Hallbergs first book Vad är sanning och 100 andra jätteviktiga frågor was released through the publishers Lagenskiöld.

References

External links

Living people
1944 births
20th-century Swedish journalists
Swedish television personalities
Journalists from Stockholm
21st-century Swedish journalists